Bampton Classical Opera is an opera company based in Bampton, Oxfordshire and founded in 1993. It specialises in the production of lesser known opera from the Classical period. Performances are always sung in English. Opera today called the company 'ambitious, innovative and imaginative'.

It works with a variety of conductors and ensembles and does not have a permanent music director. It performs with both modern and period instrument orchestras and has often appeared with the London Mozart Players and Chroma Ensemble. It particularly aims to provide performances for young singers.

History
Bampton Classical Opera was founded in 1993 by its current artistic directors, Gilly French and Jeremy Gray. Following a staging of Mozart’s rare unfinished opera L’oca del Cairo (The Cairo Goose) in 1994, the company specialised increasingly in rare works of the classical period, usually from the second half of the eighteenth-century.

Venues
The company's staged opera productions are performed in a garden setting in Bampton and at Westonbirt House, the premises of Westonbirt School, as well as at St John's, Smith Square, London.

From time to time it tours to other UK venues and festivals, which have included the Wigmore Hall and the Purcell Room in London, the Buxton Festival, the Cheltenham Music Festival and others. In addition, occasional concerts are performed including an annual one in St Mary’s Church, Bampton usually on 21 December, with other concerts in Oxford and London.

2022 Production

In summer 2022, the company will perform "Fool Moon", a new English translation of Il mondo della luna by Haydn

Other productions from 2000
In 2021 The company  gave a concert performance of The Crown by C W Gluck.

In summer 2021 the company performed Paris and Helen by Gluck, the 2020 performances having been postponed. 

In 2000 Bampton Classical Opera performed Stephen Storace’s The Comedy of Errors, with libretto by Lorenzo da Ponte. In 2001, it performed the United Kingdom staged première of The Philosopher's Stone (Der Stein der Weisen), a singspiel by Emanuel Schikaneder composed in collaboration with Mozart, Henneberg, Schack, and Gerl.

Productions before 2000
In 2003, it gave the first UK performance of Salieri's Falstaff, and in July 2007 staged the UK première of Georg Benda's Romeo and Juliet. In 2008 it presented the UK première of Leonora by Ferdinando Paer, based on the same story as Fidelio, and in 2009 Le Pescatrici (The Fisherwomen) by Haydn. In 2010, it presented Marcos Portugal's The Marriage of Figaro (1799), the first performances anywhere since its première in Venice in 1800, and The Masque of King Alfred and The Judgement of Paris by Thomas Arne. In 2011, it presented the UK concert première of Il parnaso confuso (Parnassus in Turmoil) by Gluck; The Italian Girl in London (L'italiana in Londra) by Cimarosa, first performed in 1778; and The Choice of Hercules by Handel. In 2012, it presented productions of L'amant jaloux (The Jealous Lover) by André Grétry (1778) and Blaise le savetier (Blaise the Cobbler) (1759) by François-André Danican Philidor. In 2013, it presented a new production of Mozart’s first comic opera, La finta semplice (1769), in a new English translation entitled Pride and Pretence. In 2014, it revisited La finta semplice and Gluck's Il parnaso confuso, as well as presenting Orfeo by Ferdinando Bertoni, a modern times UK première. In 2015, Bampton Classical Opera performed Salieri's Trofonio's Cave. In 2016, it staged a double bill called the Divine Comedies featuring Arne's The Judgement of Paris and, a UK première, Gluck's Philemon and Baucis - an English translation of part two of Le feste d'Apollo. In 2017, it presented the UK modern times première of The School of Jealousy by Salieri. In 2018, it presented another UK première, Isouard's Cinderella. In 2019, it performed Bride and Gloom (Gli sposi malcontenti) by Stephen Storace in an English translation by Brian Trowell. This was the second ever UK production, and it has led to Bampton Classical Opera being selected as a Finalist in the Rediscovered Work category of the International Opera Awards 2020.

Performers
Many musicians of national and international significance have performed with Bampton early in their careers.  These include conductors Thomas Blunt, Alexander Briger, Christian Curnyn, Edward Gardner, Robin Newton and Julian Perkins, directors Harry Fehr, Thomas Guthrie and Alessandro Talevi, and singers Rebecca Bottone, Ilona Domnich, Alessandro Fisher, Maire Flavin, Martene Grimson, Benjamin Hulett, Gillian Keith, Andrew Kennedy, Christopher Lowrey, Gavan Ring, Kim Sheehan, Christopher Turner, Mark Wilde and many others.

Young Singers' Competition
To celebrate its 20th anniversary and to give further support to the development of young singers, it launched a biennial Young Singers’ Competition in 2013, with the public final in Oxford’s Holywell Music Room.  First prize winners have been Ukrainian mezzo-soprano Anna Starushkevych (2013), Russian soprano Galina Averina (2015), British mezzo-soprano Emma Stannard (2017) and British soprano Lucy Anderson (2019) and Australian soprano Cassandra Wright (2021). Accompanists’ prizes have been awarded to Keval Shah, Dylan Perez and Ilan Kurtser.

Patrons

The company's patrons are Bonaventura Bottone, Brian Kay, Sir Roger Norrington, Andrew Parrott, Sir David Pountney, Sir Curtis Price and Jean Rigby. Dame Felicity Lott, the late Sir Charles Mackerras and the late Sir Philip Ledger were also patrons, as was the Rt Hon David Cameron, in whose former Witney constituency Bampton lies.

References

Jones, Roger, Review of Thomas Arne's Masque of King Alfred and The Judgment of Paris, MusicWeb International 7 November 2010 (accessed 29 January 2011)
Church, Michael, Review of Benda's Romeo and Juliet at Bampton Classical Opera, The Independent 20 September 2007 (accessed 22 April 2020)
Tanner, Michael, Review of Acis and Galatea, Spectator 24 May 2007 (accessed 22 April 2020)
Porter, Andrew, Review of Martín y Soler's La scuola dei maritati at Bampton Classical Opera, The Times 18 August 2006 (accessed 22 June 2007)
Thicknesse, Robert, Review of Paisiello's The Barber of Seville at Bampton Classical Opera, The Times 21 July 2005 (accessed 22 June 2007)
Thicknesse, Robert, Review of French double bill, Bampton Opera, Oxford Times 26 July 2012 (accessed 23 August 2012)
Coghlan, Alexandra, Salieri's Revenge Spectator 25 July 2015 (accessed 17 April 2020)

External links
Bampton Classical Opera website

British opera companies
Opera in the United Kingdom
Opera in London
Opera festivals
Classical music festivals in England
Music festivals in Oxfordshire
Musical groups established in 1993
1993 establishments in England